Darkness is a 2002 supernatural horror film directed by Jaume Balagueró and starring Anna Paquin, Lena Olin, Iain Glen, Giancarlo Giannini and Fele Martínez. The film was produced by Julio Fernández and Brian Yuzna. The film's plot follows an American family who move into a house in the Spanish countryside, where six children disappeared during an occult ritual forty years before; the teenage daughter and young son of the family are subjected to increasing disturbances in the house.

The film premiered in Spain on October 3, 2002, and was released in theaters across the country eight days later on October 11. It was sold to Miramax Films for American distribution in 2003, but ended up being put on hiatus for over a year; it was eventually released in United States theaters in an edited, PG-13-rated cut on December 25, 2004.

Plot
Forty years after an unfinished occult ritual resulted in the disappearance of six young children, the Rua family has moved from the United States into a new, never-before inhabited house in Spain. The mother, Maria, wants to get the place in order, while the father, Mark, goes to work, and their children, teenager Regina and her younger brother Paul, try to settle into their daily routines.

It helps that Mark's doctor-father, Albert Rua has furnished them with their residence and is nearby, especially when Mark begins to suffer from seizures again due to the progression of his Huntington's disease, which also causes him to become increasingly mentally unstable. Regina is not only worried about him, but also Paul who is now scared of the dark for the first time. The young boy has reason for that, however, as there seems to be some sort of supernatural entity beneath his bed. Furthermore, there are instances when six ghostly figures of children are seen standing in the shadows and darkness, watching the family.

As Paul becomes more scared and their father continues to mentally deteriorate, Regina eventually figures out it must have something to do with their home where the power is lost every day. With the help of her new friend, Carlos, the two eventually meet the man, Villalobos, who designed the house, and learn that it was built for a supernatural ritual requiring the sacrifice of seven children (each sacrificed by "hands that love them") to coincide with an eclipse that only occurs every forty years. With the next one quickly approaching, and now armed with the knowledge that the earlier occult ritual needs one more death to be completed, Regina races to make sure that Paul is not the final victim.

Stopping first at her grandfather Albert's house to warn him as well, Regina finds out that her grandfather is, in fact, a member of the cult which has been performing these satanic rituals. Her grandfather explains that in the ritual forty years ago, there actually were seven children, the seventh child being none other than Regina's father, Mark. Albert did not sacrifice his son because at the last minute he realized that he did not love Mark. Waiting 40 years, he has brought Mark and his family to the house with the intention of completing the ritual during this eclipse. Regina also discovers the target is not Paul but still Mark, who is to be sacrificed by "hands that love him." As Regina laments, Albert realizes her true love for her father. He suddenly frees her to return to the house, aware that she will be able to unknowingly carry out the ritual.

Regina races back to her home to find her father in the midst of another attack, choking on pills as the eclipse begins. Maria tries to perform a tracheotomy on him, but is unable to bring herself to make the cut. In a panic, Regina does it instead, but Mark bleeds out and dies when the supernatural forces within the house hide the pen tube needed to complete the procedure. Since Regina genuinely loved Mark, the ritual is finally complete. The darkness then takes the form of Regina and Paul, convincing their mother to turn off the lights. The darkness kills Maria, and then takes the form of Regina's friend Carlos, who picks them up in his car; shortly after they leave, the real Carlos arrives at the house, and is called inside by the darkness, manifesting as Regina's voice. Carlos' doppelgänger drives Regina and Paul into a dark tunnel, implying their doom.

Cast
 Anna Paquin as Regina "Reggie" Rua 
 Lena Olin as Maria Rua
 Iain Glen as Mark Rua
 Giancarlo Giannini as Albert Rua
 Fele Martínez as Carlos
 Stephan Enquist as Paul Rua
 Fermin Reixach as Villalobos
 David Martí as Man Sleeping on Bus (uncredited)

Production
Director Jaume Balagueró noted that The Amityville Horror (1979) and The Shining (1980) as key influences on Darkness.

Release
The film premiered in Spain on 3 October 2002, and was then given a wide release there on 11 October. It was released in a number of European countries throughout 2003, and was then sold to Miramax Films, but was shelved for nearly two years.

It was eventually theatrically released on 25 December 2004 in the US, via Miramax's Dimension Films branch, in a heavily censored Miramax-mandated PG-13 version. It was given an even later release in the United Kingdom, in March 2005.

Despite many negative reviews and very little promotion, Darkness still did moderately well at the United States box office. It was released Christmas Day 2004, which was a Saturday. It was the seventh highest earner that weekend with $6.1 million (at $3,625 average per theater), earning over half of its budget over two days. The following week, it dropped to tenth highest earner with $4.6 million. Darkness eventually earned $34.4 million worldwide, with a $10.6 million budget.

Reception
Darkness received extremely negative reviews from both critics and audiences. On Rotten Tomatoes it has an approval rating of 4% based on 55 reviews. It received an average rating of "F" on CinemaScore, indicating overwhelming dislike.

The Los Angeles Timess Kevin Thomas awarded the film one out of four stars, deeming it "trite and flat," and "too mechanical to be persuasive or scary." Ned Martel of The New York Times noted: "Darkness, which crept into theaters nationwide on Christmas Day, tries to spook holiday revelers with a guessing game about which member of a handsome American family, relocated to Spain, will kill another. But the real mystery is why such a mangled film was not junked altogether." Owen Gleiberman of Entertainment Weekly said the film is "a horror movie so vague about the nightmare it’s spinning, it seems scared of its own shadows... Darkness was clearly tossed together like salad in the editing room, since it’s little more than the sum of its unshocking shock cuts." David Blaylock The Village Voice also gave the film a middling review, writing: "Moments hint at a metaphoric statement on child abuse, but the film proves mainly to be a commentary on poor electrical wiring." Bilge Ebiri of The New York Sun similarly noted the film as containing elements of a "a disturbing family drama," adding that it is "at its best when exploring Dad's bouts with his inner demons - but it's quickly stifled by tired attempts to jolt the audience and more narrative dead-ends.

Variety praised the film's cinematography, but criticized its script: "Although director Balaguero displays a talent for spooky visuals and creating an atmosphere of quietly simmering tension, his screenplay (co-written by Fernando de Felipe) is a compendium of barely connected scenes that ultimately lapse into incoherence."

Professor Ann Davies wrote that Darkness shares similarities with the Edgar Allan Poe story The Fall of the House of Usher (1893). The breakdown of family relationships (especially the father's ancestry) are reflected in the "increasing evidence of evil" within the house. Davies also sees the film's representation of a haunted house as "part of a wider Gothic mode"  both in Spanish cinema and beyond, which "tap into memories and reflections of traumas that are unconfined by national boundaries."

See also 
 List of Spanish films of 2002
 List of films featuring eclipses

References

Sources

External links
 Official US site
 
 

2002 horror films
English-language Spanish films
American haunted house films
Films set in Spain
American supernatural horror films
Films directed by Jaume Balagueró
Spanish supernatural horror films
2002 films
Dimension Films films
Films shot in Spain
Films with screenplays by Jaume Balagueró
Filmax films
Castelao Producciones films
2000s English-language films
2000s American films
Films shot in Barcelona
Films set in Barcelona